Tslak is a rural locality (a selo) in Ashaga-Arkhitsky Selsoviet, Khivsky District, Republic of Dagestan, Russia. The population was 147 as of 2010. There are 7 streets.

Geography 
Tslak is located 15 km south of Khiv (the district's administrative centre) by road. Yukhari-Zakhit is the nearest rural locality.

References 

Rural localities in Khivsky District